The Human Part is a Finnish drama-comedy film directed by Juha Lehtola. The film premiered in Tallinn Black Nights Film Festival, and received its local premiere in Finland on 21 December 2018. The film is inspired by Kari Hotakainen's novel of the same name. The film was written by Kari Hotakainen and Juha Lehtola. Leo Viirret worked on script adaptation and dramaturgy in the film.

Plot 
Pekka Malmikunnas is a bankrupt, penniless man, who has managed to convince his family that he is still a CEO of a large IT company. Keeping up this facade has become something of a full-time job for him.

When Pekka’s parents Salme and Paavo come to the city for an unexpected visit, Pekka is in trouble. In order to dispel any doubts, Pekka throws his parents and his grown-up sisters a lavish dinner party. There they bump into Kimmo Hienlahti an even bigger smooth-talker, who finally makes Pekka realize his own impossible situation. But what can Pekka do, when telling the truth is now harder than ever?

Cast 
 Hannu-Pekka Björkman as Pekka Malmikunnas
 Asko Sarkola as Paavo Malmikunnas
 Armi Toivanen as Maija Malmikunnas
 Ria Kataja as Helena Malmikunnas
 Leena Uotila as Salme Malmikunnas
 Kari Hietalahti as Kimmo Hienlahti

Production 
The film was shot in Uusimaa in October-December 2017. The film's budget was EUR 1.4 million.

References

External links 
 

2018 films
Finnish drama films
Films based on Finnish novels
2018 drama films
2010s Finnish-language films